John Champlin Gardner Jr. (July 21, 1933 – September 14, 1982) was an American novelist, essayist, literary critic and university professor. He is best known for his 1971 novel Grendel, a retelling of the Beowulf myth from the monster's point of view.

Early life and education
Gardner was born in Batavia, New York. His father was a lay preacher and dairy farmer, and his mother taught third grade at a small school in a nearby village. Both parents were fond of poetry, and would often recite their favorite poetry and poetry they wrote about life on the farm at friends' homes. Gardner was active in the Boy Scouts of America and achieved the Eagle Scout rank. As a child, Gardner attended public school and worked on his father's farm, where in April 1945, his younger brother Gilbert was killed in an accident with a cultipacker.  Gardner, who was driving the tractor during the fatal accident, carried guilt for his brother's death throughout his life, suffering nightmares and flashbacks. The incident informed much of Gardner's fiction and criticism — most directly in the 1977 short story "Redemption," which included a fictionalized recounting of the accident as an impetus for artistic inspiration.

Gardner began his university education at DePauw University, and received his undergraduate degree from Washington University in St. Louis in 1955. He received his MA (1956) and PhD (1958) from the University of Iowa. He was distinguished visiting professor at the University of Detroit in 1970.

Fiction
Gardner's best-known novels include The Sunlight Dialogues, about a disaffected policeman asked to engage a madman fluent in classical mythology; Grendel, a retelling of the Beowulf legend from the monster's point of view, with an existential subtext; and October Light, about an embittered brother and sister living and feuding with each other in rural Vermont (the novel includes an invented "trashy novel" that the woman reads). This last book won the National Book Critics Circle Award in 1976.

Teaching and controversies
Gardner was a life-long teacher of fiction writing.  He was associated with the Bread Loaf Writers' Conference. His two books on the craft of writing fiction—The Art of Fiction and On Becoming a Novelist—are considered classics.  He was famously obsessive with his work, and acquired a reputation for advanced craft, smooth rhythms, and careful attention to the continuity of the fictive dream. His books nearly always touched on the redemptive power of art.

In 1978, Gardner's book of literary criticism, On Moral Fiction, sparked a controversy that excited the mainstream media, vaulting Gardner into the spotlight with an interview on The Dick Cavett Show (May 16, 1978) and a cover story in The New York Times Magazine (July, 1979).  His judgments of contemporary authors—including John Updike, John Barth and other American authors—harmed his reputation among fellow writers and book reviewers. Gardner claimed that lingering animosity from critics of this book led to unflattering  reviews of what turned out to be his last finished novel, Mickelsson's Ghosts, although literary critics later praised the book.

Gore Vidal found the book, as well as Gardner's novels, sanctimonious and pedantic, and called Gardner the "late apostle to the lowbrows, a sort of Christian evangelical who saw Heaven as a paradigmatic American university."

Gardner inspired and, according to Raymond Carver, sometimes intimidated his students. At Chico State College (where he taught from 1959 to 1962), when Carver mentioned to Gardner that he had not liked the assigned short story, Robert Penn Warren's "Blackberry Winter," Gardner said, "You'd better read it again."  "And he wasn't joking", said Carver, who related this anecdote in his foreword to Gardner's book On Becoming a Novelist.  In that foreword, he makes it clear how much he respected Gardner and also relates his kindness as a writing mentor.

In addition to Chico State, Gardner taught at Oberlin College (1958–1959), San Francisco State College (1962–1965), Southern Illinois University Carbondale (1965–1974) and Binghamton University (1974–1982).

Scholarship
In 1977, Gardner published The Life and Times of Chaucer.  In a review in the October 1977 issue of Speculum, Sumner J. Ferris pointed to several passages that were allegedly lifted either in whole or in part from work by other authors without proper citation.  Ferris charitably suggested that Gardner had published the book too hastily, but on April 10, 1978, reviewer Peter Prescott, writing in Newsweek, cited the Speculum article and accused Gardner of plagiarism, a claim that Gardner met "with a sigh."

He is associated with a truism that holds that, in literature, only two plots exist: someone taking a journey, or a stranger arriving in town. However, Gardner's documented words on the subject, from The Art of Fiction, were simply exercise instructions to "use either a trip or the arrival of a stranger (some disruption of order—the usual novel beginning)."

Family life
Gardner married Joan Louise Patterson on June 6, 1953; the marriage, which produced children, ended in divorce in 1980.  Gardner married poet and novelist Liz Rosenberg in 1980; this marriage ended in divorce in 1982.

Death
Gardner was killed in a motorcycle accident about two miles from his home in Susquehanna County, Pennsylvania on September 14, 1982. He was pronounced dead at Barnes-Kasson Hospital in Susquehanna. The crash was four days before his planned marriage to Susan Thornton He was buried next to his brother Gilbert in Batavia's Grandview Cemetery.

Works

Fiction
 The Resurrection. New American Library, 1966; Vintage Books, 1987, 
 The Wreckage of Agathon. Harper & Row, 1970; Dutton, 1985, 
 Every Night's a Festival. William Morrow & Company, 1971 
 Grendel. New York: Vintage Books, 1971, illustrated by Emil Antonucci, 
 The Sunlight Dialogues. Knopf, 1972, ; reprint New Directions Publishing, 2006, 
 Jason and Medeia. Knopf, 1973, ; Vintage Books, 1986,  [epic narrative poem]
 Nickel Mountain: A Pastoral Novel, Knopf, 1973, ; reprint New Directions Publishing, 2007, 
 The King's Indian. Knopf, 1974, ; reissue Ballantine Books, 1983,  [stories]
 October Light, Knopf, 1976 ; reprint New Directions Publishing, 2005, 
 In the Suicide Mountains. Knopf, 1977, 
 Vlemk the Box Painter. Lord John Press, 1979,  [fairy tale]
 Freddy's Book. Knopf, 1980, ; White Pine Press, 2007, 
 The Art of Living and Other Stories. Knopf, 1981; reprint, Vintage Books, 1989, 
 Mickelsson's Ghosts. Knopf, 1982, ; reprint New Directions Publishing, 2008, 
 Stillness and Shadows. Knopf, 1986,  [uncompleted novels]

Biography
 ; reprint Barnes & Noble Publishing, 1999,

Poems
 Poems, Lord John Press, 1978
 Jason and Medeia. Knopf, 1973, ; Vintage Books, 1986,  [epic narrative poem]

Children's stories
 Dragon, Dragon (and Other Tales). Knopf, 1975; Bantam Books, 1979, 
 Gudgekin The Thistle Girl (and Other Tales). Knopf, 1976, 
 The King of the Hummingbirds (and Other Tales). Knopf, 1977, 
 A Child's Bestiary. Knopf, 1977,

Criticism and Instruction
 The Forms of Fiction (1962) (with Lennis Dunlap) Random House, anthology of short stories
 The Construction of the Wakefield Cycle (1974)
 The Poetry of Chaucer (1977)
 On Moral Fiction, Basic Books, 1978, 
 On Becoming a Novelist (1983)
 The Art of Fiction (1983)
 On Writers and Writing (1994) ; reprint Westview Press, 1995,

Translation
 The Complete Works of the Gawain Poet (1965)
 The Alliterative Morte Arthure and Other Middle English Poems (1971)
 Tengu Child (with Nobuko Tsukui) (1983)
 Gilgamesh (with John Maier, Richard A. Henshaw) (1984)

References

Further reading

External links

 
 
 "Audio Interview with John C. Gardner", Wired for Books
 "Thirty years Later: A Conversation on John Gardner (with Joel Gardner). March 2012. 
 Audio interview of John Gardner by Stephen Banker, circa 1978

20th-century American novelists
American academics of English literature
American children's writers
American literary critics
American male novelists
American fantasy writers
Writers of books about writing fiction
California State University, Chico faculty
Motorcycling writers
Motorcycle road incident deaths
Road incident deaths in Pennsylvania
Washington University in St. Louis alumni
DePauw University alumni
University of Detroit Mercy faculty
1933 births
1982 deaths
American male essayists
20th-century American essayists
Novelists from Michigan
20th-century American male writers
University of Iowa alumni